Gezende Dam is an arch dam on the Ermenek River in Mersin Province, Turkey. The development was backed by the Turkish State Hydraulic Works.

See also

List of dams and reservoirs in Turkey

References
DSI, State Hydraulic Works (Turkey), Retrieved December 16, 2009

Dams in Mersin Province
Hydroelectric power stations in Turkey
Arch dams
Dams completed in 1990